The former Spirit Lake Public Library is located in downtown Spirit Lake, Iowa, United States.  The Civic Improvement Association started a library in a rented commercial building downtown in 1901.  The initial collections were acquired through Iowa's traveling library system.  A referendum to support a public library was passed in 1904, which made a grant from the Carnegie Corporation of New York possible.  Spirit Lake's application was accepted for a grant for $8,000 on February 1, 1905.   The search for a lot for the building delayed construction.  The library was dedicated on September 24, 1912.  The single-story brick structure was built on a raised basement, and features vaguely Tudor Revival elements.  The center frontispiece and the tall windows give it a sense of verticality.  The building was listed on the National Register of Historic Places in 1980.  The public library has subsequently been relocated into a new building, and the historic building has been converted into commercial space.

References

Library buildings completed in 1912
Carnegie libraries in Iowa
Tudor Revival architecture in Iowa
Libraries on the National Register of Historic Places in Iowa
National Register of Historic Places in Dickinson County, Iowa
Buildings and structures in Dickinson County, Iowa